Rúben Correia Alfaiate (born 17 August 1995) is a Portuguese footballer who plays for GDC Roriz, as a goalkeeper.

Football career
On 10 May 2015, Alfaiate made his professional debut with Oriental in a 2014–15 Segunda Liga match against Leixões.

Personal
He is an identical twin brother of Alexandre Alfaiate.

References

External links

Stats and profile at LPFP 
National team data 
Rúben Alfaiate at ZeroZero

1995 births
Living people
People from Peniche, Portugal
Portuguese twins
Twin sportspeople
Portuguese footballers
Association football goalkeepers
Clube Oriental de Lisboa players
Liga Portugal 2 players
Sport Benfica e Castelo Branco players
Lusitano FCV players
Portugal youth international footballers
Sportspeople from Leiria District